Charles Burchell may refer to:

 Charles Jost Burchell, Canadian diplomat
 Charles Burchell, branch secretary of the Permanent & Casual Wharf Labourers Union of Australia